Protein Muted homolog is a protein that in humans is encoded by the MUTED gene.

Function 

This gene encodes a component of BLOC-1 (biogenesis of lysosome-related organelles complex 1). Components of this complex are involved in the biogenesis of organelles such as melanosomes and platelet-dense granules. A mouse model for Hermansky–Pudlak syndrome is mutated in the murine version of this gene. Some transcripts of the downstream gene TXNDC5 overlap this gene, but they do not contain an open reading frame for this gene.

Interactions 

MUTED has been shown to interact with BLOC1S2, Dysbindin and PLDN.

References

Further reading